Princeton Airport  is a public-use airport in Montgomery, Somerset County, New Jersey, three miles (5 km) north of Princeton and just west of Rocky Hill. The airport is privately owned by Princeton Aero Corp. The airport houses the Princeton Flying School, Elite Flight Experience/Cirrus Training Center, Pacific Aircraft, Analar Helicopter Charter and Platinum Helicopters.

History 
The airport was established by Richard A. Newhouse (original spelling Neuhaus). Among his other aviation-related projects, in 1911 he built a plane of his own design, featuring separate floating ailerons — a major innovation, as the planes of that time used wing warping for roll control.

The paved runway opened about 1965, and the airport has since had occasional commuter airline flights— e.g. in 1979, Princeton Airways was operating fifteen scheduled passenger flights to Newark each weekday with Britten-Norman Islander STOL capable aircraft.  Princeton Airways also flew scheduled passenger service from the airport with the GAF Nomad STOL capable turboprop.

On March 29, 1985, the airport was purchased by Princeton Aero Corp. Principals of the company are members of the Nierenberg family, previously the fixed-base operator at Kupper Airport for eighteen years.

Princeton Flying School (formerly Raritan Valley Flying School) operates a Part 61 FAA-approved flight school at the airport.

Facilities 

In the year ending July 2, 2012 the airport had 39,421 aircraft operations, average 108 per day: 87% general aviation and 13% air taxi. 48 aircraft are based at the airport: 85% single engine, 2% multi-engine and 13% helicopters.

References

External links 
 Princeton Airport (official site)
 Princeton Flying School (official site)

Airports in New Jersey
Montgomery Township, New Jersey
Transportation buildings and structures in Somerset County, New Jersey